Free-trade zones in the United Arab Emirates are areas that have a special tax, customs and import regime, and are governed by their own framework of regulations (with the exception of UAE criminal law).

Background

The UAE has a number of free zones across Dubai, Abu Dhabi, Sharjah, Fujairah, Ajman, Ras al-Khaimah and Umm al-Quwain. Free zones may be broadly categorized as seaport free zones, airport free zones, and mainland free zones. Free-trade zone exemptions are:

 100% foreign ownership of the enterprise
 100% import and export tax exemptions
 100% repatriation of capital and profits
 Corporate tax exemptions for up to 50 years
 No personal income taxes
 Assistance with labor recruitment, and additional support services, such as sponsorship and housing.

Each Free Zone is designed around one or more business industry categories and only offers licenses to companies within those categories. An independent Free Zone Authority (FZA) governs each free zone, and is the agency responsible for issuing FTZ operating licenses and assisting companies with establishing their business in the FTZ.

Investors can either register a new company in the form of a Free Zone Establishment (FZE) or simply establish a branch or representative office of their existing or parent company based within the UAE or abroad. An FZE is a limited liability company governed by the rules and regulations of the Free Zone in which it is established. Except for acquiring nationality in the UAE, the provisions of the Commercial Companies Law (CCL) do not apply to FZEs, provided that the Free Zones have special provisions regulating such companies.

There are a few Free Zones in UAE that offers Dual Business License for investors. It will allow them to do business in the Free Zone as well as in the mainland of UAE using the same business license. For Example, Sharjah Publishing City (SPC) Free Zone offers a Dual License for the investors enabling them to easily offer services in the mainland and Free Zone together.

Advantages of setting up business in Dubai Free Zone
There are several reasons why many aspiring business owners choose the emirate and free zones in Dubai. The following benefits provided are most likely the primary reason: 
Government ownership is not interrupted. The matter of possession is fully in the hands of investors.
Companies within Free Zones are not subject to duty-free shopping.
Profits and capital are fully repatriated.
Imports and exports are exempt from tariffs, taxes, and duties. Warehouse usage is free.
A company located in a free zone can be run independently by any foreign investor.
For 15 years, corporations are also exempt from corporate tax.
Confidentiality is assured throughout the operation.
Different activities are available to investors, including owning property. Bank accounts can be opened easily for him.
Employees of the company and other support staff, as well as the housing facilities, can get visas without any problems.

Free zones
 

There are 46 Free Zones operating in UAE. 

Abu Dhabi
 Abu Dhabi Airport Free Zone (ADAFZ)
 Abu Dhabi Global Market
 Khalifa Industrial Zone
 Industrial City of Abu Dhabi
 Higher Corporation for Specialized Economic Zones / ZonesCorp 
 Masdar City Free Zone
twofour54
Dubai 
 International Free Zone Authority (IFZA)
 Dubai Airport Free Zone
Dubai Auto ZZone
 Dubai Biotechnology & Research Park  (DuBiotech)
 Dubai Car and Automotive City Free Zone  (DUCAMZ)
 Dubai Design District
Dubai Flower Center
 Dubai Gold and Diamond Park
 Dubai Healthcare City
 Dubai Industrial City (DIC)
 Dubai International Academic City
 Dubai International Financial Centre
 Dubai Internet City (DIC)
 Dubai Knowledge Village
 Dubai Logistics City
 Dubai Media City
 Dubai Multi Commodities Centre
 Dubai Outsource Zone
 Dubai Silicon Oasis
Dubai Science Park
 Dubai Techno Park
Dubai Textile Village
 Dubai Technology and Media Free Zone
 International Media Production Zone
International Humanitarian City
 Jebel Ali Free Zone
Jumeirah Lakes Towers Free Zone
 Dubai South or DWC
Dubai Production City
Meydan Free zone
Sharjah
 Hamriyah Free Zone
 Sharjah Airport International Free Zone
  U.S.A. Regional Trade Center (USARTC) Free Zone
 Sharjah Publishing City Free Zone
 Sharjah Media City Free Zone (Shams)
 Sharjah Publishing City Free Zone (SPC Free Zone)

Ajman
 Ajman Free Zone
 Ajman Media City Free Zone

Ras Al Khaimah
Ras Al Khaimah Economic Zone (RAKEZ)
RAK Maritime City Free Zone Authority (RMCFZA)
Ras Al Khaimah Investment Authority 
 Ras Al Khaimah Free Trade Zone
 Ras Al Khaimah Media Free Zone

Fujairah
 Fujairah Free Zone
 Fujairah Creative City

Umm Al Quwain
 Umm Al Quwain Free Trade Zone (UAQFTZ)

Free zones under construction
 Dubai Maritime City
 Dubai Carpet Free Zone
 Dubai Auto Parts City
 Heavy Equipment and Trucks Zone
 Mohammad Bin Rashid Technology Park
 Dubai International Arbitration Center

See also
 Free economic zone
 List of free-trade zones in Dubai
 List of company registers
 List of offshore financial centres
 List of financial districts

References 

Economy of the United Arab Emirates-related lists
Geography of the United Arab Emirates
Government-owned companies of the United Arab Emirates
Neighbourhoods in the United Arab Emirates
 
Lists of companies of the United Arab Emirates
United Arab Emirates geography-related lists